Homonhon Island is an island in the province of Eastern Samar, Philippines, on the east side of Leyte Gulf.

Mantoconan, an islet just off the northwest corner of Homonhon, is also part of the approximately 7,500 islands comprising the Philippine Archipelago. The island is one of the early Pacific contact sites between the East and the West.

History
During the first circumnavigation of the globe, Ferdinand Magellan's three surviving vessels passed the Marianas, but did not land, even though he was out of food after crossing the Pacific Ocean. Yet he landed on the island of Homonhon on March 16, 1521. Despite Homonhon being uninhabited at that time, he was detected by the fishing boats of nearby local settlements. The local leaders arrived in more boats, receiving him warmly and trading food and supplies with Magellan's crew. Magellan later left for  Limasawa Island.

Barangays

List of Barangays in Homonhon island by population (2020 census)

 Bitaugan - 445
 Cagusu-an - 707
 Canawayon - 427
 Casuguran - 964
 Culasi - 446
 Habag - 317
 Inapulangan - 548
 Pagbabangnan - 559

Total population = 4,413

References

Islands of Eastern Samar
Guiuan